Sacerdotii nostri primordia ("From the beginning of our priesthood") was the second encyclical of Pope John XXIII,  issued 1 August 1959. It commemorated the 100th anniversary of the death of St. John Vianney, the patron saint of priests.

See also
 List of encyclicals of Pope John XXIII
 Saint John Vianney's prayer to Jesus

References

text on Vatican website.

Papal encyclicals
Works by Pope John XXIII
1959 in Christianity
1959 documents
August 1959 events